The Hohhot City Stadium (Simplified Chinese: 呼和浩特市体育场) is a multi-use stadium in Hohhot, China. It is currently used mostly for football matches of Inner Mongolia Zhongyou F.C. This stadium holds 51,632 people. This stadium was built from May 2005. It opened on 6 July 2007. A metro station serving the stadium opened on Line 2 of the Hohhot Metro in October 2020.

External links
 StadiumDB page

Footnotes

Football venues in China
Sports venues in Inner Mongolia
Buildings and structures in Hohhot